Barbatula toni is a species of ray-finned fish in the genus Barbatula.

A freshwater fish, it is found in rivers in Russia, Mongolia, China and Japan that flow into the northwestern Pacific.

References

toni
Fish described in 1869